is a Japanese footballer currently playing as a forward for Cerezo Osaka.

Career statistics

Club
.

Notes

References

External links

2002 births
Living people
Sportspeople from Chiba Prefecture
Association football people from Chiba Prefecture
Japanese footballers
Association football forwards
J3 League players
Cerezo Osaka players
Cerezo Osaka U-23 players